Klaus-Günter Jordan (often spelled Günther and known as Beppo, 17 September 1940 – 7 December 2011) was a West German rower.

Jordan was born in 1940. He started rowing at RC Nassovia Höchst at age 15. He won a gold medal at the 1962 World Rowing Championships in Lucerne with the men's coxed pair.

Jordan died on 7 December 2011 after a short illness.

References

1940 births
2011 deaths
West German male rowers
World Rowing Championships medalists for Germany
European Rowing Championships medalists